Petty cash is a small amount of discretionary funds in the form of cash used for expenditures where it is not sensible to make any disbursement by cheque, because of the inconvenience and costs of writing, signing, and then cashing the cheque.

The most common way of accounting for petty cash expenditures is to use the imprest system. The initial fund would be created by issuing a cheque for the desired amount. An amount of $100 would typically be sufficient for most small business needs as the expenses to be covered are for small amounts. The bookkeeping entry for this initial fund would be to debit Petty Cash and credit bank account. This cheque would then be cashed to acquire the actual cash needed for payments.

As expenditures are made, the custodian of the fund  (a bookkeeper or a member of the administration staff) will reimburse employees and receive a petty cash voucher with a receipt/invoice attached in return. At any given time, the total of cash on hand plus reimbursed vouchers must equal the original fund.

When the fund gets low, e.g. $20 remaining, the custodian requests a top up and submits the vouchers for reimbursement. Assuming the vouchers add up to $80, an $80 top up cheque is issued and an $80 debit towards office expenses is recorded. Once the cheque is cashed, the custodian again has cash at the original amount of $100.

Audit controls
Oversight of petty cash is important because of the potential for abuse. Examples of petty cash controls include a limit (such as 10% of the total fund) on disbursements and monthly audits by someone other than the custodian. Use of petty cash is sufficiently widespread that vouchers for use in reimbursement are available at any office supply store.

The petty cash daybook is one of the daybooks used in bookkeeping and the double-entry bookkeeping system.

References 

Payments
Accounting journals and ledgers
de:Kasse#Portokasse